Davide Lewton Brain (born 23 December 1998) is an Monégasque-French figure skater who represents Monaco in men's singles. He is the 2019 Coupe du Printemps silver medalist and two-time Monégasque national champion (2018, 2019).

Personal life 
Lewton Brain was born on 23 December 1998 in Nice, France. He is currently studying marketing at INSEEC Business School.

Competitive highlights 
CS: Challenger Series; JGP: Junior Grand Prix

References

1988 births
French male single skaters
Monegasque figure skaters
Living people